The 2013 Aspria Tennis Cup – Trofeo CDI was a professional tennis tournament played on clay courts. It was the eighth edition of the tournament which was part of the 2013 ATP Challenger Tour. It took place in Milan, Italy between 17 and 23 June 2013.

Singles main draw entrants

Seeds

 1 Rankings are as of June 10, 2013.

Other entrants
The following players received wildcards into the singles main draw:
  Alessandro Bega
  Gianluigi Quinzi
  Riccardo Sinicropi
  Matteo Trevisan

The following players received entry from the qualifying draw:
  Oliver Golding
  Máximo González
  Filip Krajinović
  Andrej Martin

The following player received entry as special exempt:
  Ivo Minář

Doubles main draw entrants

Seeds

1 Rankings as of June 10, 2013.

Other entrants
The following pairs received wildcards into the doubles main draw:
  Alessandro Petrone /  Riccardo Sinicropi
  Gianmarco Amico /  Alessandro Busca
  Marco Crugnola /  Daniele Giorgini

The following pair received entry as an alternate:
  Nils Langer /  Maxime Teixeira

Champions

Singles

 Filippo Volandri def.  Andrej Martin, 6–3, 6–2

Doubles

 Marco Crugnola /  Daniele Giorgini def.  Alex Bolt /  Peng Hsien-yin, 4–6, 7–5, [10–8]

External links
Official Website

Aspria Tennis Cup - Trofeo CDI
Aspria Tennis Cup